Letcher may refer to:

Places
Letcher, South Dakota
Letcher County, Kentucky

People 
Chris Letcher, South African singer/songwriter
Cliff Letcher (born 1952), Australian professional tennis player
John Letcher, American lawyer and politician
John D. Letcher, American academic
Lesley Letcher, New Zealand soccer player
Robert P. Letcher, American politician
Tom Letcher, baseball outfielder

See also
 Lecher (disambiguation)
 Letscher, a surname